Jean-Paul Sermain is a French academic teaching at the University of Paris III: Sorbonne Nouvelle. A specialist of the eighteenth century, his research concerns the 18th-century French literature, the poetics of the novel and fairy tales. He also leads studies on works by Marivaux, Prévost and Diderot.

Bibliography 
1999: Le Singe de don Quichotte : Marivaux, Cervantes et le roman postcritique, Oxford : Voltaire Foundation
2002: Métafictions 1670-1730. La réflexivité dans la littérature, Paris, 
1985: Rhétorique et roman au dix-huitième siècle : l’exemple de Prévost et de Marivaux (1728–1742), Oxford, Voltaire Foundation at the Taylor Institution
2005: Le conte de fées du classicisme aux lumières, Paris, Desjonquères, Prix Ève Delacroix.
2009: Les Mille et une nuits entre Orient et Occident, Paris, Desjonquères

References

External links 
  Jean-Paul Sermain on France Culture
 Jean-Paul Sermain on the site of the Académie française
 Jean-Paul Sermain on the site of Université Sorbonne Nouvelle
 Jean-Paul Sermain on the site of Université Sorbonne Nouvelle
 Jean-Paul Sermain on Thèses
 Jean-Paul Sermain, Métafictions (1670-1730). La réflexivité dans la littérature d’imagination complete text
 Jean-Paul Sermain, Le Conte de fées du classicisme aux Lumières complete text

21st-century French historians
Academic staff of Sorbonne Nouvelle University Paris 3